John Kennedy is a Gaelic football manager and former player from County Kerry, Ireland. He led Clare to the 2004 Tommy Murphy Cup. He also managed the Kerry minor team between 2006 and 2009, winning Munster Minor Football Championship titles in 2006, 2008 and 2009, and leading his team to the 2006 All-Ireland Minor Football Championship final, where they lost to Roscommon after a replay. He took over as manager of the Kerry under-21 team in 2010. He played at senior level for Kerry in the mid to late 1980s, winning All-Ireland SFC titles in 1984, 1985 and 1986.

References

Year of birth missing (living people)
Living people
Asdee Gaelic footballers
Gaelic football managers
Kerry inter-county Gaelic footballers
Winners of two All-Ireland medals (Gaelic football)